Josia radians is a moth of the  family Notodontidae. It is found in Amazonian Colombia and Ecuador.

Larvae have been recorded on Passiflora capsularis, Passiflora rubra, Passiflora cuneata and Passiflora manicata.

External links
Species page at Tree of Life project

Notodontidae of South America
Moths described in 1905